Salunga is an unincorporated community and census-designated place (CDP) in West Hempfield and East Hempfield townships in Lancaster County, Pennsylvania, United States. As of the 2010 census the population was 2,695. The community was once part of the Salunga-Landisville CDP, before splitting into two separate CDPs for the 2010 census, the other being Landisville.

Geography
Salunga is in northwestern Lancaster County, in the northeastern part of West Hempfield Township and the western part of East Hempfield Township. It is bordered to the east by Landisville. Pennsylvania Route 283, a four-lane freeway, forms the northeastern edge of the CDP, with access from an interchange with Spooky Nook Road. PA 283 leads southeast  to Lancaster, the county seat, and northwest  to Harrisburg, the state capital.

Chiques Creek flows past the northwest side of the community, running southwest to the Susquehanna River.

References 

Census-designated places in Lancaster County, Pennsylvania
Census-designated places in Pennsylvania